Joyce Bateman (born 1957) is a Canadian politician. She served as the Member of Parliament (MP) for the electoral district of Winnipeg South Centre from 2011 to 2015.

Early and personal life
Born in Winnipeg, Manitoba, Bateman was involved in the musical community. After training four summers at the Banff School of Fine Arts, she went to study at the University of Western Ontario under Ralph Aldrich. She put herself through university there by playing viola in the London Symphony Orchestra and received her HBA from the Ivey School of Business.

After attending business school, Bateman articled with Price Waterhouse in Winnipeg. She is a chartered accountant.

Bateman was elected to the Winnipeg School Board as a trustee in 2001. She served two terms as chairperson, and one term as vice-chairperson. Her tenure saw the reinstatement of the Nursery Program for the Winnipeg School Division in 2005. It had been cut by the Board in 1998.

Federal politics
In late 2003, Bateman became a member of the Liberal Party. She allowed her party membership to lapse in 2009. In 2011, she said that she opted to run as a Conservative due to misgivings over the fiscal policies of the Liberal Party, which she described as "reckless."

In 2011, given her four-time successful electoral record as a school trustee (2001, 2002, 2006 and 2010), Bateman was sought out by the Conservative Party of Canada to run in Winnipeg South Centre. She was successful.

While serving in Parliament there was a serious problem with a rail crossing in her riding. As a result, she introduced a Private Members’ Bill on Rail Safety which makes every rail crossing throughout Canada safer.

Bateman was defeated in 2015 by former Liberal provincial MLA Jim Carr, falling to 28 percent of the vote.

Bateman re-contested her previous riding in a rematch against Carr in the 2019 federal election but lost. She lost again in the 2021 federal election.

Personal life

Bateman has worked and lived in Winnipeg since completing school. She met Darrell Hancock while at Price Waterhouse. Hancock and Bateman are married and have two children.

Electoral record

References

External links

Conservative Party of Canada MPs
Members of the House of Commons of Canada from Manitoba
Women members of the House of Commons of Canada
Living people
Politicians from Winnipeg
Women in Manitoba politics
University of Western Ontario alumni
21st-century Canadian politicians
21st-century Canadian women politicians
1957 births